Nengo Bridge Hydroelectric Power Station, often referred to as Nengo Bridge Power Station is a planned  mini-hydroelectric power station in Uganda, the third-largest economy in the East African Community.

Location
The power station is located across the Mirera River between Rukungiri District and Kanungu District at the location of Nengo Bridge, along the road between Rukungiri and Kanungu.

Overview
Nengo Bridge Power Station is run of the river, mini-hydropower installation, with planned capacity of 6.7 MW. Jacobsen Elektro, a Norwegian power development company, through its Ugandan subsidiary, Jacobsen Elektro Uganda Limited, owns the development rights to the power station. Jacobsen Elektro also owns the 50-Megawatt Namanve Thermal Power Station in Mukono District, which they developed in 2008.

Construction costs
, the exact construction budget for the power plant and the high-tension power lines that will evacuate the generated electricity to where it will be integrated into the national grid is not publicly known.

Construction time table
The power station is one of the nine renewable energy projects in Uganda that were awarded production licenses in October 2014 by the Electricity Regulatory Authority (ERA). Construction is expected to start in December 2014, and last approximately two years.

See also

List of power stations in Uganda
Africa Dams
Power Dams

References

External links
  Estimated Location of Nengo Bridge Hydropower Station At Google Maps
  Rukungiri District Homepage

Hydroelectric power stations in Uganda
Rukungiri District
Western Region, Uganda